Carrie Barton (born May 19, 1976) is a former synchronized swimmer from the United States. 
Barton competed in the women's team event at the 2000 Summer Olympics, finishing in fifth place. In 2012, she was inducted into the United States Synchronized Swimming Hall of Fame.

References 

1976 births
Living people
American synchronized swimmers
Olympic synchronized swimmers of the United States
Synchronized swimmers at the 2000 Summer Olympics
World Aquatics Championships medalists in synchronised swimming
20th-century American women